Gedali Shapiro (Grzegorz Szapiro) (later Gedalia Shapira) (28 October 1929 – 28 December 1972) was a Polish–Israeli chess master, born in Siedlce.

He tied for 7-8th at Wrocław (Breslau) 1955 Polish Championship. He played for “Poland B” in 3rd Triennial Cup (HUN–CSR–POL) at Warsaw 1956.

Szapiro played twice in Chess Olympiads.
 In 1956, at first reserve board in 12th Chess Olympiad in Moscow (+1 –4 =2) for Poland;
 In 1962, at second reserve board in 15th Chess Olympiad in Varna (+4 –2 =5) for Israel.

He tied for 4-5th with Yair Kraidman, behind Milan Matulović, Petar Trifunović and Moshe Czerniak, at Netanya 1961.

He died in Rishon Lezion, Israel.

References

1929 births
1972 deaths
20th-century Polish Jews
Polish chess players
Israeli chess players
Jewish chess players
People from Siedlce
Sportspeople from Masovian Voivodeship
20th-century chess players
Polish emigrants to Israel